Henri Steenacker (22 April 1926 – 25 August 1993) was a Belgian rower. He competed in the single sculls at the 1952 Summer Olympics and in the double sculls at the 1956 Summer Olympics, together with his brother Fernand, but failed to reach the final on both occasions. Steenacker won a bronze medal in the double sculls at the 1957 European Championships, together with Gérard Higny.

Steenacker died aged 67 in a cycling accident.

References

1926 births
1993 deaths
Belgian male rowers
Rowers at the 1952 Summer Olympics
Rowers at the 1956 Summer Olympics
Olympic rowers of Belgium
European Rowing Championships medalists
20th-century Belgian people